Per Henrik Wallin (July 17, 1946 – June 15, 2005) was a Swedish jazz pianist and composer. He was acclaimed in Continental Europe, but relatively obscure in the United States. He received the Swedish variant of the Golden Django two years before his death.

References 

1946 births
2005 deaths
Swedish jazz pianists
Swedish composers
Swedish male composers
20th-century pianists
Male pianists
20th-century Swedish male musicians
20th-century Swedish musicians
Male jazz musicians